Baker's Biographical Dictionary of Musicians is a major reference work in the field of music, originally compiled by Theodore Baker, PhD, and published in 1900 by G. Schirmer, Inc. The ninth edition, the most recent edition, was published in 2001 —  years after the first edition.

Edition history
Leading up to the initial publication of Baker's Biographical Dictionary of Musicians, Baker had compiled and edited three editions of A Dictionary of Musical Terms — published 1895, 1896, and 1897, respectively, by G. Schirmer, Inc.

First edition
The first edition, published in 1900, has 647 pages plus an Appendix of 5 pages. It includes 300  portraits drawn in ink, from portraits or photographs, by Russian artist Alexander Gribayédoff (possibly a pseudonym for Valerian Gribayédoff).

Fourth edition
The fourth edition, published in 1940, has 1,234 pages. American and Latin-American musicians were more fully represented in this issue than in any English work of the kind in its day.

Fifth edition
The fifth edition was rewritten by new editor Nicolas Slonimsky, who would remain editor for several decades (up to the eighth edition in 1992) and have a considerable influence on the style and content of the dictionary. In preparing the fifth edition, Slonimsky expanded the size of the work to 1,855 pages and undertook a thorough review of the existing entries, expending considerable effort verifying and correcting biographical details such as birth and death dates by reference to archival sources.

Eighth edition
The eighth edition of 1992 revised 1,300 entries and added 1,100 new ones, coming to 2,115 pages, with an emphasis on expanding coverage of female and Asian musicians, multimedia composers, performance artists, and ethnomusicologists. The seventh and eighth editions were pre-titled The Concise Edition.

Ninth edition
The ninth edition of 2001, billed the "Centennial Edition", was the first not to be a single-volume work, taking up six volumes, partly due to expanded coverage and partly due to somewhat more generous formatting to improve readability. The ninth edition included a focus on increasing coverage of popular music and jazz.

History of its publishers
G. Schirmer, Inc., publisher of Baker's since the first edition, was sold to Macmillan Inc. in 1969.

Macmillan sold G. Schirmer, except for its reference holdings, to Music Sales Corporation of London in 1986. Schirmer Reference is currently owned by Gale, a division of Cengage Learning.

Editions
Edited by Theodore Baker (1851–1934)
 First edition (1900); 
 Supplement (1905); 
 Second edition (1905); 

Edited by Theodore Baker and Alfred Remy (1870–1927)
 Third edition (1919); 

Edited by Nicolas Slonimsky (1894–1995)
 Fourth edition (revised & enlarged) (1940); 
 Second printing (revised & enlarged) (1940);  
 Third printing (revised & enlarged) (1949);  
 Fifth edition (1958); 
 Supplement (1965); 
 Supplement (1971); 
 Sixth edition (1978); 
 Abridged (1988); 

Edited by Laura Diane Kuhn, PhD (born 1953)
 Vol. 1: Aalt–Cone; 
 Vol. 2: Conf–Gysi; 
 Vol. 3: Haar–Levi; 
 Vol. 4: Levy–Pisa; 
 Vol. 5: Pisc–Stra; 
 Vol. 6: Stre–Zyli; Indexes (genre, nationality, women); 
 pdf version; 

Other editions
 The Portable Baker's Biographical Dictionary of Musicians (1988);  
 Slonimsky (ed.); Richard Kostelanetz (ed.); Michael Stutzman (assistant ed.)
 Baker's Biographical Dictionary of Twentieth-Century Classical Musicians (1997), Nicolas Slonimsky, Laura Kuhn (born January 19, 1953) (ed.), Dennis McIntire (Associate ed.)

Other works of similar nature
 Earlier works
 1844: Complete Encyclopedia of Music, Elementary, Technical, Historical, Biographical, Vocal, and Instrumental, by John Weeks Moore, Boston; 
 1879: A Dictionary of Music and Musicians, George Grove (ed.), London; 

 Later, contemporaneous American works
 1939: International Cyclopedia of Music and Musicians, Oscar Lee Thompson (1887–1945) (ed.), Dodd, Mead and Company, New York;

References

Works cited

 

Musicians
Encyclopedias of music
1900 non-fiction books